Ceuthophilus californianus is a species in the family Rhaphidophoridae ("camel crickets"), in the order Orthoptera ("grasshoppers, crickets, katydids"). The species is known generally as the "California camel cricket".
It is found in North America.

References

Further reading
 Capinera J.L, Scott R.D., Walker T.J. (2004). Field Guide to Grasshoppers, Katydids, and Crickets of the United States. Cornell University Press.
 Otte, Daniel (2000). "Gryllacrididae, Stenopelmatidae, Cooloolidae, Schizodactylidae, Anostostomatidae, and Rhaphidophoridae". Orthoptera Species File 8, 97.

External links
NCBI Taxonomy Browser, Ceuthophilus californianus

californianus
Insects described in 1862